The women's long jump event at the 1971 Pan American Games was held in Cali on 31 July and 1 August.

Medalists

Results

Qualification

Final

References

Athletics at the 1971 Pan American Games
1971